Houston National Cemetery is a United States National Cemetery in Harris County, Texas, near Houston. It encompasses  only about half of which is developed. The cemetery had more than 111,000 interments as of 2021.  It was listed on the National Register of Historic Places in 2017.

History 
First established on December 7, 1965, as a Veterans Administration Cemetery, it became Houston National Cemetery in 1973 after the passage of the National Cemetery Act. It was the only government cemetery constructed in the United States during the 1960s and was the largest of its kind at the time of construction.

Notable monuments 

The Hemicycle, a large semi-circular monument which surrounds a chapel and a 75' high bell tower, with a large courtyard for open air ceremonies. The Hemicycle is the largest memorial and the most visible structure at the cemetery. The memorial is the only NCA-managed hemicycle memorial and is one of three hemicycles located in national cemeteries. The others are located at Arlington National Cemetery and Manila American Cemetery and Memorial in the Philippines.

Located in the center of the hemicycle are the chapel, carillon and speaker's stand. David Parsons, a professor of art at Rice University, sculpted a  bas relief of three forms, a fallen soldier supported by two comrades. The  tower, 305-bell, Schulmerich carillon was dedicated May 30, 1970.

Notable interments 

 Medal of Honor recipients
 Captain James H. Fields, for action in World War II
 Staff Sergeant Marcario Garcia, for action in World War II
 First Lieutenant Raymond L. Knight, for action in World War II
 First Sergeant David McNerney, for action in the Vietnam War
 Others
 Dan Bankhead, the first African American pitcher in major league baseball
 Kermit Beahan, bombardier of the Bockscar, which dropped the second atomic bomb in Japan
 Willard Brown, Baseball Hall of Famer
 Goree Carter, rock and roll pioneer and Korean War veteran
 Margie Duty, first African American woman on the Houston police force
 Hal Epps, Major League Baseball player
 Lisa Gaye, actress
 Amos Milburn, musician
 J. L. Parks, basketball player
 Albert Thomas, US Representative

References

External links

 National Cemetery Administration
 Houston National Cemetery
 
 
 

Historic American Landscapes Survey in Texas
Protected areas of Harris County, Texas
United States national cemeteries
Cemeteries in Harris County, Texas
National Register of Historic Places in Harris County, Texas
Cemeteries on the National Register of Historic Places in Texas
1965 establishments in Texas